Independent Sector is a coalition of nonprofits, foundations and corporate giving programs. Founded in 1980, it is the first organization to combine the grant seekers and grantees.

Located in Washington, D.C., Independent Sector largely works on federal policy issues that affect the nonprofit and philanthropic sector, including tax incentives and exemption status of organizations within the sector.

Several other organizational goals include cultivating leaders and emerging leaders, supporting and enhancing organizational effectiveness and ethical practices, and being the vital voice of the sector.

History
Independent Sector was created in 1980 with the merger of two nonprofit associations: the National Council of Philanthropy and the Coalition of National Voluntary Organizations. The charter meeting was held in Washington, D.C., on March 5, 1980. Brian O'Connell was the first president and John W. Gardner was the first Governing Board Chair.

Leadership
Dr. Akilah Watkins is the President and CEO of Independent Sector as of January 2023. 
Since its founding in 1980, Independent Sector has had the following board chairs:

References

External links

 Independent Sector Records, 1971-1996, Ruth Lilly Special Collections and Archives, IUPUI University Library, Indiana University Purdue University Indianapolis

Organizations established in 1980
Non-profit organizations based in Washington, D.C.